Peter L. Wittrock Jr. (born October 28, 1984), known as Finn Wittrock, is an American actor and screenwriter who began his career in guest roles on several television shows. He made his film debut in 2004, in Halloweentown High before returning to films in the 2010 film Twelve. After studying theater at The Juilliard School, he was a regular in the soap opera All My Children from 2009 to 2011, while performing in several theatrical productions. In 2011, he performed in playwright Tony Kushner's Off-Broadway play The Illusion and made his Broadway debut in 2012 as Happy Loman in the revival of Arthur Miller's play Death of a Salesman, directed by Mike Nichols.

In 2014, he gained recognition for his roles in the films The Normal Heart, Noah, and Unbroken, and garnered a Primetime Emmy Award nomination for his role as Dandy Mott in the FX series American Horror Story: Freak Show. In 2015, he portrayed model Tristan Duffy and actor Rudolph Valentino in American Horror Story: Hotel, and starred in the ensemble cast of the dramedy film The Big Short. In 2016, Wittrock guest starred as Jether Polk in American Horror Story: Roanoke, and played Greg in Damien Chazelle's La La Land. In 2018, he portrayed murder victim Jeffrey Trail in the FX crime drama series The Assassination of Gianni Versace: American Crime Story for which he received a second Emmy nomination. In his seventh collaboration with Ryan Murphy, Wittrock played serial killer Edmund Tolleson in the Netflix series Ratched (2020).

Early life
Wittrock was born in Lenox, Massachusetts, the son of Kate Claire Crowley, a professor of occupational therapy at the University of Southern California, and Peter L. Wittrock, an actor. He has a younger brother, Dylan. As a child, he grew up at the Shakespeare & Company theatre, where his father worked, and would often act as a pageboy or messenger. As a teenager, he attended the Los Angeles County High School for the Arts, where he would act, make films and be a part of movement classes for actors. After graduating from high school, he was accepted into the Juilliard School, but turned them down, hoping to get work in Los Angeles.

Wittrock acted in some episodes for television, but would often face rejection. He auditioned for Juilliard the next year and was accepted again. He attended the school, where he was a member of the drama division's Group 37 (2004–2008). He was an active participant in the drama department and starred in several theatrical productions. He also won the Juilliard Journal Award, in recognition of his outstanding contributions to Juilliard's newspaper, The Juilliard Journal; and was the recipient of the drama division's Stephanie Palmer McClelland Scholarship. He graduated with a Bachelor of Fine Arts in 2008.

Career
At the end of high school, Wittrock appeared in guest stints on the police procedural series Cold Case and medical drama ER. He also made an appearance on CSI: Miami and in the Disney Channel Original Movie Halloweentown High (2004) during his time at drama school. After graduating from Juilliard, he portrayed Romeo in Washington, D.C.'s regional theatre, the Shakespeare Theatre Company's production of Romeo and Juliet, as well as playing the role of Eugene Marchbanks in the 2008 production of Candida at the Berkshire Theatre Festival. He later portrayed Damon Miller in the long-running series All My Children from 2009 to 2011, portrayed Troilus in the 2009 Off-Broadway play The Age of Iron, and appeared in the teen drama film Twelve (2010).

In 2011, Wittrock starred in the Off-Broadway play The Illusion by famous playwright Tony Kushner. Director Mike Nichols came to see the play and later told Wittrock to audition for producer Scott Rudin for their upcoming revival of Arthur Miller's Death of a Salesman. He got the part of Harold "Happy" Loman and made his Broadway debut in 2012 opposite Philip Seymour Hoffman. The Nichols-directed play won the Tony Award for Best Revival of a Play and Wittrock won a Theatre World Award and the Clarence Derwent Award for Most Promising Male Performer. Later that year, he starred in a production of The Deep Blue at the Williamstown Theatre Festival directed by Bob Balaban. He also appeared on series such as Harry's Law, Criminal Minds and played the role of gigolo Chance Wayne in the David Cromer-directed production of Tennessee Williams' play Sweet Bird of Youth at The Goodman Theatre

In 2013, he starred in the play adaptation of the film The Guardsman at The Kennedy Center, directed by Gregory Mosher. He also guest-starred on Law & Order: Special Victims Unit and on several episodes of the series Masters of Sex.

In 2014, Wittrock first collaborated with director Ryan Murphy in the HBO television film The Normal Heart, based on the play of the same name. He also appeared in the films Winter's Tale and director Darren Aronofsky's Noah, playing a young Tubal-cain. He next collaborated with Murphy playing the integral part of the wealthy Dandy Mott on American Horror Story: Freak Show, the fourth season of the FX anthology series American Horror Story for which he was a series regular. For his performance, Wittrock received a nomination for the Primetime Emmy Award for Outstanding Supporting Actor in a Miniseries or a Movie. Wittrock rounded out 2014 by starring as World War II Air Force bombardier Francis "Mac" McNamara in Angelina Jolie's biographical war drama film Unbroken, which revolves around the life of USA Olympian and athlete Louis "Louie" Zamperini.

In 2015, Wittrock marked his third collaboration with Murphy as model Tristan Duffy and actor Rudolph Valentino in the fifth installment of American Horror Story, subtitled Hotel. Also in 2015, he co-starred in Adam McKay's drama film The Big Short. In 2016, Wittrock had a small role in the musical La La Land, directed by Damien Chazelle, and released in December. He co-stars as Cassio alongside Daniel Craig and David Oyelowo in the Sam Gold-directed production of William Shakespeare's Othello, which started its run on December 12 at the New York Theatre Workshop.

In 2017, Wittrock returned to Broadway, in the Sam Gold-directed production of Tennessee Williams' play The Glass Menagerie, opposite Sally Field and Joe Mantello. The play opened on March 23, 2017 and closed on July 2, 2017. That year, Wittrock also appeared in Gillian Robespierre's comedy film Landline. In 2018, he briefly played actor Tim Matheson in David Wain's comedy A Futile and Stupid Gesture.

In August 2018, he starred with Kristen Stewart in the music video for Indie band Interpol's music video for "If You Really Love Nothing".

Wittrock co-starred as Judy Garland's fifth and final husband Mickey Deans in the biopic Judy (2019), directed by Rupert Goold. In January 2019, it was announced that Wittrock will star in the upcoming Netflix drama series Ratched, as well as appearing in one episode of American Horror Story: 1984.

In April 2021, Wittrock had officially been cast as Guy Gardner for the HBO Max live action television series based on Green Lantern, Lanterns.

Personal life
On October 18, 2014, Wittrock married his longtime girlfriend and fellow Juilliard graduate, Sarah Roberts, in a private ceremony. In March 2019, the couple had a son, Jude.

Filmography

Film

Television

Stage

Awards and nominations

Notes

References

External links
 

1984 births
Living people
21st-century American male actors
American male film actors
American male Shakespearean actors
American male soap opera actors
American male stage actors
American male television actors
Male actors from Massachusetts
Juilliard School alumni
People from Lenox, Massachusetts
Los Angeles County High School for the Arts alumni
Screenwriters from California
Screenwriters from Massachusetts
Theatre World Award winners